Qizcheh (also Romanized as Qīzcheh; also known as Qīnarcheh, Qīnarjeh, and Qīzjeh) is a village in Quri Chay-ye Gharbi Rural District, Saraju District, Maragheh County, East Azerbaijan Province, Iran. At the 2006 census, its population was 21, in 5 families.

References 

Towns and villages in Maragheh County